Dwight Heald Perkins II (born in Chicago, Illinois, in 1934) is an American academic, economist, Sinologist and professor at Harvard University.  He is the son of Lawrence Bradford Perkins, architect, and Margery Blair Perkins and the grandson of Dwight Heald Perkins, the architect.  He married Julie Rate Perkins in 1957 and they have three adult children.

Early life
Perkins graduated in 1952 from Evanston Township High School,  and earned an undergraduate degree at Cornell University in 1956. After two years military service in the US Navy, Perkins resumed his studies as a graduate student at Harvard. He earned a MA in economics in 1961 and a Ph.D. in economics in 1964. His doctoral thesis was "Price Formation in Communist China".

Academic career
Perkins's teaching career at Harvard began when he was still a graduate student and continued uninterrupted through 2006, when he became a research and emeritus professor. He was a member of both the Department of Economics of the Faculty of Arts and Sciences at Harvard and of Harvard's Kennedy School of Government. He was a Phi Beta Kappa Visiting Scholar in 1992-93. He has published 25 books and over 150 articles dealing with general issues of economic development but mainly focused on the economic history and development of China, Korea, and the economies of Southeast Asia ("cv").

Though Perkins began his studies of China and the Chinese language as an undergraduate at Cornell in 1954, he didn't make his first visit to the People's Republic of China until 1974, as a consultant to the Permanent Subcommittee on Investigations of the United States Senate, accompanying Senator Henry M. Jackson of the state of Washington.  He accompanied Jackson on two subsequent trips to China in 1978 and 1979, during which the Senator and his advisers had talks with Deng Xiaoping and other senior officials of the Chinese government.("Report of Senator Henry M. Jackson to the Committee on Armed Services and the Committee on Energy and Natural Resources, U.S. Government Printing Office, October 1979)  He led a delegation of the Committee on Scholarly Communications with the People's Republic of China (CSCPRC) to study rural, small-scale industry in 1975 and in 1979 he was a member of the first CSCPRC economics delegation to China, led by Lawrence Klein of the University of Pennsylvania in Philadelphia.  In over 80 trips to the People's Republic of China since then, he has lectured at various universities and was made an honorary professor/researcher of the Shanghai Academy of Social Sciences and the Central China University of Science and Technology, which also awarded him the Chang Peigang Award in 2010 for contributions to development economics (www.everychina.news.com).  He was the first Cornelius Van der Starr Distinguished Fellow of the China Development Research Foundation in 2008-09 and worked with the Foundation and the Development Research Center of the State Council in various capacities, including many of their Development Forums.(cv)

In 1975-76, Perkins served as acting director of Harvard's Fairbank Center for East Asian Research.  A year later, he became chairman of the department of economics of Harvard University and from 1980 through 1995 served as director of the Harvard Institute for International Development (HIID). Later, he also became director of Harvard's Asia Center (ref Who's Who in America,1994, p. 2684, "cv"). During his tenure as director of HIID, the Institute had resident advisers on macroeconomics, government management and legal reform, environmental regulation, maternal and child health, and education in the relevant ministries in 27 countries in Asia, Africa, Latin America, and Eastern Europe (Dwight H. Perkins, Richard Pagett, Michael Roemer, Donald Snodgrass, and Joseph Stern, Assisting Development in a Changing World: The Harvard Institute for International Development, 1980-1995 (Cambridge: Harvard University Press, 1997); and HIID biannual reports. Prior to becoming director, Perkins served as an advisor to the Economic Planning Unit of the Government of Malaysia in 1968-69 and later led a team to advise the Malaysian government on civil service reform (2004-2007).  In 1972 he served as an advisor to the Korea Development Institute (KDI) in Seoul during its first year and subsequently worked with KDI to jointly manage and help write research that produced more than fifteen books on the Korean economy and society, five of which he coauthored.  In 1989 he led a team to Vietnam to explore working with the Vietnamese government on its transition from a command to a market economy and in subsequent years continued to give lectures in Vietnam and work with the government on market reforms.  In 1995 as part of that effort, together with Thomas Vallely of HIID and others, he helped establish the Fulbright Economic Teaching Program in Ho Chi Minh City, a year-long program of economics training for government officials and private economics personnel. He then taught two semesters in that program (1997-98) and gave lectures and had oversight responsibility for the program until 2009, first through HIID and subsequently via the Kennedy School. (Assisting Development in a Changing World, and various issues of The Fulbright Economics Teaching Program: Guide to Programs and Courses). He served on an advisory committee to the Prime Minister of Papua New Guinea in 1991-92, was inducted into the American Philosophical Society in 2002, and was a member of the International Advisory Group of the Privatization Commission and Prime Minister of Papua New Guinea in 2000-2002.(cv).

Selected works
In a statistical overview derived from writings by and about Dwight H. Perkins, the economist, OCLC/WorldCat encompasses roughly 100 works in 250+ publications in 7 languages and 6,900+ library holdings.

 Market Control and Planning in Communist China (1966)
 China, Asia's Next Economic Giant (1986)
 Agricultural Development in China, 1368-1968 (1969)
 China's Modern Economy in Historical Perspective: sponsored by the Social Science Research Council (1975)
 Rural Development in China (1984)
 Reforming Economic Systems in Developing Countries (1991)
 The Economics of Development(1st edition 1983, 7th edition 2013)

Notes

References
 Suleski, Ronald Stanley. (2005). The Fairbank Center for East Asian Research at Harvard University: a Fifty Year History, 1955-2005. Cambridge: Harvard University Press. ;  OCLC 64140358

1934 births
American economists
American sinologists
Harvard Graduate School of Arts and Sciences alumni
Harvard University faculty
Living people
Harvard Institute for International Development
Members of the American Philosophical Society
Cornell University alumni
Evanston Township High School alumni